The  is a railway line that runs through Tokyo and Chiba Prefecture, Japan. Part of the East Japan Railway Company (JR East) network, the line operates on separate tracks along the right-of-way of the Chūō Main Line (Chūō Line (Rapid)) and Sōbu Main Line (Sōbu Line (Rapid)), providing service between Mitaka Station in the cities of Mitaka and Musashino and Chiba Station in Chiba.

Service patterns

Chūō-Sōbu Line

Regularly, trains terminate at Chiba or Tsudanuma at the east side, and terminate at Nakano or Mitaka at the west side
All trains stop at every station.
For station information on the parallel rapid/express lines, see the Chūō Line (Rapid) and Sōbu Line (Rapid) articles.

Tōzai Line through service 
All through service trains enter the Tōzai Line at either Nakano, or Nishi-Funabashi.  These trains operate within the following routes:

 Mitaka – Nakano – (Tōzai Line) – Nishi-Funabashi – Tsudanuma (weekday mornings/evenings only) 
 Nakano – (Tōzai Line) – Nishi-Funabashi – Tsudanuma (weekday mornings/evenings only) 
 Mitaka – Nakano – (Tōzai Line) – Nishi-Funabashi
 Mitaka – Nakano – (Tōzai Line) – Nishi-Funabashi – (Tōyō Rapid Railway Line) – Tōyō-Katsutadai

Limited express 
Certain limited express and seasonal trains run through, or stop at stations on this line.

Former Early morning / Late night 
At around 9 -10pm, a few westbound trains headed beyond Mitaka onto the Chūō Line (Rapid), with some terminating at Musashi-Koganei, and the others at Tachikawa. The other trains during the hour operated regularly.

At around 4 - 6am and 11pm - 1am, Chūō-Sōbu Line services were divided at Ochanomizu Station, into two sections. 

 At the eastern section (Ochanomizu – Chiba), local trains operated and terminated at the two ends of the section.

This service pattern last operated on 13 March 2020. To prepare for the eventual installation of platform doors on Chūō-Sōbu Line platforms and the future addition of Green Cars on the Rapid line, Chūō Line Rapid service trains no longer regularly operate on the Chūō-Sōbu Line tracks.

Station list 

 Legend
 ●: All trains stop
 ■: Some trains pass
 ▲: All trains pass on weekends and holidays
 ｜: All trains pass

Rolling stock

Chūō-Sōbu Line 
Trains used on the line are based at Mitaka Depot.

E231-0 series 10-car EMUs (yellow stripe) (since February 2000)
E231-500 series 10-car EMUs (yellow stripe) (since 1 December 2014)

Tozai Line - Toyo Rapid Line through service 
Trains run between Mitaka and Tsudanuma (Chūō-Sōbu Line) or Toyo-Katsutadai (Toyo Rapid Line), all via the Tokyo Metro Tozai Line between Nakano and Nishi-Funabashi.

 E231-800 series 10-car EMUs (light blue and blue stripe) (Does not run on the Toyo Rapid Line)

 Tokyo Metro 05 series 10-car EMUs (light blue stripe)
 Tokyo Metro 07 series 10-car EMUs (light blue stripe)
 Tokyo Metro 15000 series 10-car EMUs (light blue stripe)

Former rolling stock

Chūō-Sōbu Line 
101 series EMUs (yellow livery) (from 1963 until November 1988)
103 series 10-car EMUs (yellow livery) (from 1979 until March 2001)
201 series 10-car EMUs (yellow livery) (from 1982 until November 2001)
205 series 10-car EMUs (yellow stripe) (from August 1989 until November 2001)
209-500 series 10-car EMUs (yellow stripe) (from December 1998 until 19 April 2019)
E231-900 series 10-car EMU (yellow stripe) (from 27 March 1999 as 209-950 series, until 25 February 2020)

Tozai Line - Toyo Rapid Line through service 
301 series 10-car EMUs (light blue stripe) (on Tozai Line inter-running services from 1966 until 2003)

Chūō Line (Early morning / Late night) 
 See Chūō Line (Rapid)#Rolling stock for the train types which operated this service until 13 March 2020.

Timeline

History

Women-only cars, designed to prevent gropers, were introduced on this line during morning peak periods starting on 20 November 2006.

On 20 August 2016, station numbering was introduced to the Chuo-Sobu line with stations being assigned station numbers between JB01 and JB39. Numbers increase towards in the eastbound direction towards Chiba.

References

External links

 Chūō-Sōbu Line (Japan Visitor) 

Railway lines in Tokyo
Lines of East Japan Railway Company
Railway lines in Chiba Prefecture
1067 mm gauge railways in Japan
Railway lines opened in 1932
1932 establishments in Japan